Clinical Leukemia was a quarterly peer-reviewed medical journal that was published by CIG Media Group from 2006 until 2009. The journal covered research on the detection, diagnosis, prevention, and treatment of leukemia. The editor-in-chief was Jorge Cortes.

Abstracting and indexing 
The journal was abstracted and indexed in CINAHL, Scopus, Embase, and Chemical Abstracts Service.

External links 
 

Oncology journals
Publications established in 2006
Hematology journals
English-language journals
Quarterly journals
Publications disestablished in 2009